The Bridgeport Newfield Steelers were an American basketball team based in Bridgeport, Connecticut that was a member of the American Basketball League. Before the 1949/50 season, the team became the Bridgeport Aer-A-Sols and for their final season was renamed the Bridgeport Roesslers.

Year-by-year

Defunct basketball teams in Connecticut
Sports in Bridgeport, Connecticut
Basketball teams in the New York metropolitan area
Basketball teams established in 1948
Basketball teams disestablished in 1952
1948 establishments in Connecticut
1952 disestablishments in Connecticut